The Feminist Porn Awards (FPAs) is an annual adult film awards ceremony that began in 2006, and was initially organized by the Good for Her adult store in Toronto, Ontario, Canada. Until 2014, the ceremony was officially known as the Good for Her Feminist Porn Awards.

History
Critiquing portrayals of women's sexuality and masculinity in adult films was not enough, so Good For Her founded the Feminist Porn Awards to celebrate work that complicates dominant representations of desire, desirability, sexuality and gender. The ceremony was originally conceived of and coordinated by former store manager Chanelle Gallant, and it has been organized by current store manager Alison Lee since 2008. Both the store and the ceremony are based in Toronto, Ontario, and the ceremony commonly takes place at Berkeley Church. Despite the name of the ceremony, Lee states that the films featured at the awards (as well as the ceremony itself) are meant to appeal to men as well as women.

Winners at the FPAs are awarded trophies in the shape of butt plugs.

Criteria
According to the official website, nominations for an FPA are dependent upon three criteria:
Women and/or traditionally marginalized people were involved in the direction, production and/or conception of the work.
The work depicts genuine pleasure, agency and desire for all performers, especially women and traditionally marginalized people.
The work expands the boundaries of sexual representation on film, challenges stereotypes and presents a vision that sets the content apart from most mainstream pornography.  This may include depicting a diversity of desires, types of people, bodies, sexual practices, and/or an anti-racist or anti-oppression framework throughout the production.

See also
 Gender equality
 Feminist art movement
 Feminist pornography
 Feminist views of pornography
 Sex-positive feminism
 Sex-positive movement
 Women's erotica
 Women's pornography

References

External links

Feminist pornography
Pornographic film awards
Sex-positive feminism
Feminist art organizations
Canadian film awards
Feminist organizations in Canada